Allison Wonderland: The Mose Allison Anthology is a two disc compilation album by the jazz pianist and songwriter Mose Allison, released in 1994. Rhino sequenced the selected songs (which span over 40 years, from 1957 to 1989), and include all of his best-known songs chronologically.

Track listing

Disc One
"Back Country Suite: Blues [A.K.A. 'Young Man's Blues']" (Mose Allison)    
"Lost Mind"    
"Parchman Farm" (Mose Allison)    
"If You Live" (Mose Allison)    
"The Seventh Son" (Willie Dixon)
"Eyesight to the Blind"    
"Baby, Please Don't Go"    
"Fool's Paradise"    
"V-8 Ford Blues"    
"Ask Me Nice" (Mose Allison)    
"Hey, Good Lookin'"    
"Back On The Corner" (Mose Allison)    
"Your Mind Is On Vacation"  (Mose Allison, Audre Mae)   
"Meet Me At No Special Place"    
"I Don't Worry About A Thing" (Mose Allison)    
"I Ain't Got Nothing But The Blues"    
"Swingin' Machine" (Mose Allison)   
"Stop This World" (Mose Allison)    
"I'm Not Talking" (Mose Allison)    
"I'm The Wild Man" (Stanley Willis, Don Barksdale)
"Your Red Wagon"    
"Foolkiller" (Mose Allison)    
"Wild Man On The Loose" (Mose Allison)    
"You Can Count On Me To Do My Part" (Mose Allison)    
"Smashed" Live (Mose Allison)    
"I Love The Life I Live" Live  
"That's Alright" Live 
"Fool's Paradise" Live

Disc Two
"If You're Goin' To The City" (Mose Allison)    
"Everybody Cryin' Mercy" (Mose Allison)    
"Feel So Good" (Mose Allison)    
"Molecular Structure" (Mose Allison)    
"Monsters Of The Id" (Mose Allison)    
"Hello There, Universe" (Mose Allison)    
"I Don't Want Much" (Mose Allison)    
"How Much Truth" (Mose Allison)    
"Western Man" (Mose Allison)    
"I'm Just a Lucky So-and-So" (Duke Ellington, lyrics-Mack David)
"The Tennessee Waltz"    
"Ever Since The World Ended" (Mose Allison)    
"Top Forty" (Mose Allison)    
"Josephine"    
"Gettin' There" (Mose Allison)    
"Ever Since I Stole The Blues" (Mose Allison)    
"You Call It Joggin'"    
"Big Brother" (Mose Allison)    
"The Gettin' Paid Waltz" (Mose Allison)

References

1994 compilation albums
Mose Allison albums
Rhino Records compilation albums